Michurino is a rural locality (a village) in Kletnyansky District, Bryansk Oblast, Russia. The population was 47 as of 2010. There is 1 street.

Geography 
Michurino is located 16 km northeast of Kletnya (the district's administrative centre) by road. Sinitskoye is the nearest rural locality.

References 

Rural localities in Kletnyansky District